Dúo Dinámico (Dynamic Duo in English) is a Spanish musical duo, which was very popular in Spain in the 1960s. It is formed by Manuel de la Calva and Ramón Arcusa, singers, songwriters, record producers and actors. They were the main precursors of pop music in Spain.

Career 
Manolo and Ramón met when they were 16 years old, working as aeronautical engineering apprentices. The duo officially formed on 28 December 1958 in Barcelona. Their first performance before a live audience was on Radio Barcelona; they wanted to be called The Dynamic Boys, but the show host, Enrique Fernández, said he did not speak English and introduced them as Dúo Dinámico, a name the musicians accepted. After that came more radio performances and a contract to sing at La Masía, a famous restaurant in Barcelona, all while they still worked as engineers. Finally, in the summer of 1959 they quit their day jobs to dedicate themselves to their nascent music career.

They recorded their first EP in the fall of 1959, and it was a sales success. From then on, their ascent was spectacular, and they frequently topped the Spanish charts throughout the 60's with hits like "Quince años tiene mi amor", "Quisiera ser", "Perdóname", "Bailando el twist", "Mari Carmen", "Esos ojitos negros", "Amor de verano" or "Mi chica de ayer". They also starred in four films. Their popularity among Spanish music fans was comparable, if not superior, to the one achieved by The Beatles.

The Duo often participated in the various music festivals that took place in Spain at the time. They won the Mediterranean Song Festival in Barcelona in 1966 with "Como Ayer"; the Costa Verde Festival in Gijón with "Somos Jóvenes"; and they were twice second in the Benidorm International Song Festival, in 1962 and 1966, with "Quisiera ser" and "Amor amargo". But their greatest achievement came as composers, when their song "La, la, la" won the 1968 Eurovision Song Contest, performed by Massiel. This was the first time that Spain won this festival, and the only time that Spain has been the sole winner (Spain won again in 1969, but tied with other three countries). The song was originally going to be performed by the duo's friend Joan Manuel Serrat, but he insisted on singing in Catalan, something that Franco's regime would not allow.

After the sales failure of their 1972 album Mejor que nunca, recorded in London with the collaboration of George Martin, the duo decided to retire, but they kept composing for other artists such as Camilo Sesto and Nino Bravo, and producing for Julio Iglesias, Miguel Gallardo or José Vélez.

Due to the continuing popularity of their songs, included in the soundtracks of many popular Spanish films and TV shows, and the insistence of various entrepreneurs, the duo made a comeback in 1978. A greatest hits album was released in 1980, and in 1986, they started to record new songs under a new contract with Sony Music. In 1990, one of them, "Resistiré", was included in the soundtrack of Pedro Almodóvar's film Átame.

The duo was presented with the Latin Grammy Lifetime Achievement Award in 2014.

As of 2016, the duo are still active, performing their hits in yearly live tours throughout Spain.

On 21 September 2007, the jukebox musical Quisiera ser, featuring 24 hits of the Dúo Dinámico, premiered at the Teatro Nuevo Apolo in Madrid.

See also
 List of bands from Spain

References

External links
 Official page (in Spanish)

Musical groups from Catalonia
Spanish musical duos
Eurovision Song Contest winners
Latin Grammy Lifetime Achievement Award winners